Morse Field may refer to:

Morse Field, the field at Alfond Stadium (University of Maine)
 Morse Field (Hawaii), a former military airfield near Naʻālehu, Hawaii